The Qapal (Qapal) is a river of Almaty Province, south-eastern Kazakhstan. It is a tributary of the Qyzylaghash, which ends in the plains south of Lake Balkhash. The main settlement on the river is the village Qapal.

Rivers of Kazakhstan